Beautiful Connection is a Singaporean Chinese family drama serial. It was telecast in 2002. The show earned many nominations for the Star Awards including Best Actor, Best Actress, Best Supporting Actress, Best TV Drama, Best Theme Song, Best Director and many more.

This drama repeated in Year 2007, on MediaCorp TV Channel 8, Mondays and Tuesdays, 10.30pm to 12.30am.

The series is also mentioned in episode 45 of 118 Season 1.

Plot 
Beautiful Connection begins with the lives of three daughters from a single-parent family, headed by a domineering and unreasonable mother, Fatty Zhen. The three daughters have characters that are very different as a result of their mother's upbringing.

Spoilt by Fatty Zhen, the youngest daughter, Ke Ke, is well-educated but arrogant. On the other hand, Ke Lian and Ke Li's happiness have been short-changed to create more opportunities for their youngest sister.

Despite this, both Ke Lian and Ke Li are able to adapt better to society, unlike Fatty Zhen and Ke Ke, whose attitude puts people off. Ke Lian eventually finds true love with Lion King, while Ke Li finds happiness in her own family and career. It is only in the face of an economic crisis and a stroke that Fatty Zhen had, did the arrogant Fatty Zhen and Ke Ke realise and learn about humility and the importance of maintaining good human relationships.

While Beautiful Connection reflects on the harsh realities and pressures of working life, it also shows that there will always be hope and warmth even during a depressing time such as an economic crisis.

Cast

Main cast

Supporting Cast

Accolades

External links
Beautiful Connection Theme Song
Official Website (English Edition)
Official Website (Chinese Edition)

Singapore Chinese dramas
2002 Singaporean television series debuts
Channel 8 (Singapore) original programming